Sharona Muir is an American writer and academic.

Early life
She is the daughter of the late Israeli-American inventor and author, Itzhak Bentov who died as a passenger on American Airlines Flight 191 in 1979.

Muir graduated from Princeton University in 1978, received an M.A. in Creative Writing and English from Boston University in 1980, and a Ph.D. in Modern Thought and Literature from Stanford University in 1991.

Work
She taught at Stanford University and at Tel Aviv University, and is currently a professor of creative writing at Bowling Green State University.

Muir's most recent book, Invisible Beasts, was published by Bellevue Literary Press in 2014.  A bestiary in novel form, featuring imaginary animals based on scientific facts, Invisible Beasts was named a Title to Pick Up Now in O, the Oprah Magazine as well as a Publishers Weekly Book of the Week and a Top Indie Fiction Selection by Library Journal.

Muir's memoir, The Book of Telling: Tracing the Secrets of My Father's Lives, published by Random House/Schocken Books in 2005, was positively reviewed in The Times Literary Supplement, by Kapka Kassabova, March 10, 2006; and in The Jerusalem Post, by Barbara Hollander, December 9, 2005.  The memoir received the 2007 Nancy Dasher Award for the best book in the creative writing category, from the College English Association of Ohio. The memoir deals with Muir's search for the past of her scientist father, Itzhak Bentov.

Muir's work has appeared in The New York Times", "Granta", Stand, The Kenyon Review, The Jerusalem Report, Harvard Magazine, The Virginia Quarterly Review, Ploughshares, The Paris Review, The Yale Review, and many other journals.

Her tales, "Menu:Extinction," "The Golden Egg:An Evolutionary Fable," "Think Monkey," and "Feral Parfumier Bees," may be seen in the online editions of, respectively, Granta, The Kenyon Review (KROnline), Michigan Quarterly Review, and Ancora Imparo, (see links).

Selected awards
 2001 National Endowment for the Arts Fellowship
 1998 The Hodder Fellowship: Fellows
 1997 and 2002, Ohio Arts Council Fellowships in poetry and nonfiction
 1996 Memorial Foundation for Jewish Culture Fellowship
 1990 Whiting Foundation Fellowship for doctoral studies
 1984 Bernard F. Connors Prize for Poetry

Works

Poetry

Fiction

Memoir

Literature

References

External links
  Interview with Muir on Publishers Weekly Radio
  "The Crazy Puppy and The Flying Boy," in The New York Times, Opinionator section, in the Menagerie series
  "Menu:Extinction" in Granta
  "Think Monkey in Michigan Quarterly Review
  "The Couch Conch" in Michigan Quarterly Review
  Review of Invisible Beasts in O, the Oprah Magazine
  Graphic review of Invisible Beasts in Publishers Weekly
  Review of Invisible Beasts in io9
  Review of Invisible Beasts in Bostonia
  "Feral Parfumier Bees"
 "Animal Wisdom in the Age of Extinction: E.O. Wilson's 'Anthill'"
 "The Golden Egg: An Evolutionary Fable"
 "Sharona Muir: Interview"

Year of birth missing (living people)
Living people
Princeton University alumni
Boston University College of Arts and Sciences alumni
Stanford University alumni
Stanford University faculty
Bowling Green State University faculty
Academic staff of Tel Aviv University
American women poets
American women academics
21st-century American women
American people of Slovak-Jewish descent
American people of Israeli descent